Joseph Joachim Tugas de Leon (born January 8, 1973), better known as Keempee de Leon, is a Filipino actor, comedian, singer, songwriter and TV host. He is the son of Joey de Leon and Daria Ramirez.

Career
Keempee de Leon started his career in the entertainment industry in 1988 via the Viva Films film I Love You 3x a Day, where he was paired with Gelli de Belen and worked with soon-to-be-co-host of Eat Bulaga!, Jimmy Santos. Soon after, he became a regular fixture in three TV shows: Eat Bulaga!, That's Entertainment and Agila. 

In April 1989, he signed his first recording contract with OctoArts International (now PolyEast Records). 

In 1990, he was a subject of a tug-of-war between Regal Films and Viva Films when Regal got Keempee to appear as lead role in the romantic comedy movie Romeo Loves Juliet opposite Aiko Melendez. In the end, Keempee chose to remain with Viva Films and signed a contract. In 1992, he was launched as a junior action star via the movie Jesus dela Cruz at ang mga Batang Riles with Ana Roces as his leading lady. The action film was a mild success and it was followed up with Blue Jeans Gang with Dennis Padilla and Leah Orosa as co-stars.  However, unlike Batang Riles, Blue Jeans Gang was a flop at the box-office.

Keempee openly admitted to the public in 1993 that he became a victim of drug abuse and as a result, he underwent rehabilitation at New Beginnings in Sucat, Parañaque. Despite this however, he managed to finish two big movies before he went on sabbatical. The two big movies were: Viva's Sana'y Ikaw na Nga with Christopher de Leon and Vina Morales, and Alyas Batman en Robin with dad Joey de Leon. After his rehabilitation, he became a member of Victory Christian Fellowship while resuming his stalled showbiz career in 1994.

He had his biggest break on TV by playing a leading role in GMA's Villa Quintana with Donna Cruz as his leading lady. He is a former VIVA contract star along with other members of That's Entertainment with Donna Cruz, Jessa Zaragosa, Vina Morales and others. He became Best Drama Actor for Villa Quintana in Star Awards for television.  He was also a co-host in GMA Supershow from 1995 to 1997 and a gag performer in IBC 13's Goin' Bayabas, a remake of the '80s gag show Goin' Bananas in 1998.

In 2002, after he graduated and finished his studies at college, he returned to the small screen via ABS-CBN's Klasmeyts and Recuerdo de Amor, but in 2004, he returned to GMA Network where he was signed up to portray the gay Harold in Bahay Mo Ba 'To?. In the sitcom he was paired with Francine Prieto. Their tandem became a hit and he continued playing gay roles in the reality sitcom Kung Ako Ikaw and in films.

In 2008, Keempee returned to primetime via LaLola which stars Rhian Ramos and JC de Vera.  He also returned to comedy film for his comeback movie, Iskul Bukol: 20 Years After, an official entry to the 2008 Metro Manila Film Festival, together with Tito Sotto, Vic Sotto and his father, Joey De Leon. After LaLola, he plays Paul in the Philippine remake of Korean drama All About Eve. The following year, he became part of another Korean remake drama Full House which stars Heart Evangelista and Richard Gutierrez. Keempee co-hosts a singing competition Are You The Next Big Star? where he works with famous singer, Regine Velasquez.

In 2013, he appeared in the TV series My Husband's Lover where he portrayed Zandro Soriano. Netizens laud Keempee for Zandro role in My Husband's Lover. In the series, Zandro is the cross dresser cousin of Vincent Tom Rodriguez, who is a closet bisexual at this point in the story. Zandro's and Vincent's dads are both "allergic" to having gay members in the family but Vincent's father, Gen. Armando Soriano, a retired general, is more vocal – and violent – with regard to the issue.

In March 2016, he was expelled from Eat Bulaga! after 14 years of hosting. However, he stayed with GMA Network from 2015 to 2018 as he appeared on the network's different soap operas. His most notable latest works were Little Nanay, where he got to work for the first time with the Superstar Nora Aunor; and Meant to Be where he worked for the first time with former That's Entertainment cast members, most notably Manilyn Reynes and Janno Gibbs.

In 2018, he transferred back to ABS-CBN where he reunited with erstwhile girlfriend Cristine Reyes in the drama Nang Ngumiti ang Langit in 2019.  In 2020, Keempee became part of the drama series, Bagong Umaga with co stars former PBB housemates Heaven Peralejo & Barbie Imperial.

Keempee's hairstyle
Keempee de Leon sported a curtain haircut back in the 90s that was imitated by young men at the time. Named after him, Keempee, is parted in the middle of the head and long bangs reach as far as the ears. Up until today, Keempee, the hairstyle, is considered a trademark of the era.

Personal life
De Leon has a child named Samantha with his former girlfriend. His past relationships were Manilyn Reynes, Carmina Villarroel, Vina Morales, Ara Mina, Jessa Zaragoza, Bernadette Allyson, Angelika Dela Cruz and Pauleen Luna. In an interview, De Leon reveals that Ina Raymundo and G. Toengi were his ex-girlfriends also.

De Leon is a part owner of two restaurants, Locavore and Kermit Manila. Locavore is located in Bonifacio Global City while Kermit Manila is in Poblacion, Makati.

Discography

Also Featured on

Filmography

Film

Television

TV specials
That's Entertainment Anniversary Special (GMA Network)
Kapamilya: ABS-CBN at 50 TV Special 
Eat Bulaga Silver Special (GMA Network)
GMA at 55: The GMA Anniversary Special
Dolphy Alay Tawa: A Musical Tribute to the King of Philippine Comedy
Tribute to the Master Showman Kuya Germs (GMA Network)

Awards and nominations

References

External links

Filipino male child actors
Filipino male comedians
Filipino male television actors
Male actors from Manila
That's Entertainment (Philippine TV series)
That's Entertainment Thursday Group Members
20th-century Filipino male singers
Filipino songwriters
1973 births
Filipino people of Spanish descent
ABS-CBN personalities
GMA Network personalities
Viva Artists Agency
Living people
Filipino male film actors